The 2013 St Helens season saw the club compete in Super League XVIII as well as the 2013 Challenge Cup tournament.

Transfers

Pre-season friendlies

Super League

Matchday Squads

Challenge Cup

References

 

St Helens R.F.C. seasons
Super League XVIII by club